The 1994 Grand Prix Hassan II was an ATP men's tennis tournament played on outdoor clay courts in Casablanca, Morocco that was part of ATP World Series of the 1994 ATP Tour. It was the 10th edition of the tournament and was held from 14 March until 21 March 1994. First-seeded Renzo Furlan won the singles title.

Finals

Singles

 Renzo Furlan defeated  Karim Alami 6–2, 6–2
 It was Furlan's second and last singles title of the year and of his career.

Doubles

 David Adams /  Menno Oosting defeated  Cristiano Brandi /  Federico Mordegan 6–3, 6–4

References

External links
 ITF tournament edition details
 ATP tournament profile